Alturas Municipal Airport , is a city-owned public-use airport located one nautical mile (1.85 km) west of the central business district of Alturas, a city in Modoc County, California, United States. This airport is included in the FAA's National Plan of Integrated Airport Systems for 2009–2013, which categorizes it as a general aviation facility.

Although most U.S. airports use the same three-letter location identifier for the FAA and IATA, Alturas Municipal Airport is assigned AAT by the FAA but has no designation from the IATA (which assigned AAT to Altay Airport in Altay, Xinjiang, China).

Facilities and aircraft 
It has two asphalt paved runways: 13/31 is 4,300 by 50 feet (1,311 x 15 m) and 3/21 is 3,096 by 60 feet (944 x 18 m). For the 12-month period ending December 31, 2008, the airport had 31,500 aircraft operations, an average of 86 per day: 95% general aviation and 5% air taxi.

References

External links 
 Aerial image as of 25 August 1998 from USGS The National Map
 

Airports in Modoc County, California
Alturas, California